Ryan Nembhard (born March 10, 2003) is a Canadian college basketball player for the Creighton Bluejays of the Big East Conference.

High school career
Nembhard attended Montverde Academy, where he played alongside Division 1 prospects Precious Achiuwa, Cade Cunningham, Scottie Barnes, Day'Ron Sharpe, Moses Moody, Jalen Duren, Caleb Houstan and Langston Love. Following his freshman season, he opted to reclassify from the class of 2022 to the class of 2021. As a senior, Nembhard helped Montverde defeat Sunrise Christian Academy 62–52 to win the 2021 GEICO High School Basketball Nationals. He finished with 12 points, 7 assists, 3 rebounds and 2 steals and won game MVP honors. Regarded as a four-star recruit, Nembhard was ranked No. 68 in his class and the No. 11 point guard according to 247Sports. In June 2020, he committed to playing college basketball for Creighton, choosing the Bluejays over Ohio State, Stanford, Florida and Seton Hall.

College career
In his college debut against Arkansas–Pine Bluff, Nembhard posted 15 points and 10 assists in a 90–77 win. On November 16, 2021, he scored 22 points and had five rebounds and five assists in a 77–69 win against Nebraska. On February 23, 2022, Nembhard suffered a wrist injury in an 81–79 win against St. John's which required season-ending surgery. He averaged 11.3 points, 3.1 rebounds, 4.4 assists and 1.3 steals per game as a freshman. Nembhard started all 27 games and was a six-time Big East Freshman of the Week honoree. He was named Big East Freshman of the Year.

National team career
Nembhard has represented Canada in several international competitions. At the 2019 FIBA Under-16 Americas Championship in Brazil, he averaged 14.3 points, 9 assists and 2 steals per game. In the 2021 FIBA Under-19 Basketball World Cup in Latvia, Nembhard averaged 15.1 points, 3.7 rebounds and 6.7 assists per game, leading his team to the bronze medal. He scored 21 points in the third-place game against Serbia.

Personal life
Nembhard is the son of Mary and Claude Nembhard. His older brother Andrew plays professionally for the Indiana Pacers.

References

External links
Creighton Bluejays bio

2003 births
Living people
Basketball people from Ontario
Canadian men's basketball players
Creighton Bluejays men's basketball players
Montverde Academy alumni
Point guards
Sportspeople from Aurora, Ontario